Many radio stations operate in the former Philippine region of Southern Tagalog, now Calabarzon and Mimaropa. Although Calabarzon is served by the Metro Manila radio market, some areas in the region have their own provincial radio markets.

Calabarzon

Batangas

AM stations

FM stations

Cavite

FM stations

Laguna

AM stations

FM stations

Quezon

AM stations

FM stations

Mimaropa

Marinduque

FM Stations

Occidental Mindoro

AM Stations

FM Stations

Oriental Mindoro

FM Stations

Palawan

AM Stations

FM Stations

Romblon

FM Stations

References

Southern Tagalog